Narcissus and Goldmund (also published as Death and the Lover) is a novel written by the German–Swiss author Hermann Hesse which was first published in 1930. At its publication, Narcissus and Goldmund was considered Hesse's literary triumph; chronologically, it follows Steppenwolf.

Synopsis

Narcissus and Goldmund is the story of a young man, Goldmund, who wanders aimlessly throughout Medieval Germany after leaving a Catholic monastery school in search of what could be described as "the meaning of life".

Narcissus (German: "Narziss" or, before the German orthography reform of 1996, Narziß ), a gifted young teacher at the cloister school, quickly befriends Goldmund, as they are only a few years apart, and Goldmund is naturally bright. Goldmund looks up to Narcissus, and Narcissus has much fondness for him in return. After straying too far in the fields one day on an errand gathering herbs, Goldmund comes across a beautiful Gypsy woman, who kisses him and invites him to make love. This encounter becomes his epiphany; he now knows he was never meant to be a monk. With Narcissus' help, he leaves the monastery and embarks on a wandering existence. 

Goldmund finds he is very attractive to women, and has numerous love affairs. After seeing a particularly beautiful, carved Madonna in a church, he feels his own artistic talent awakening and seeks out the master carver, with whom he studies for several years. However, in the end, Goldmund refuses an offer of guild membership, preferring the freedom of the road. When the Black Death devastates the region, Goldmund encounters human existence at its ugliest. Finally, after being imprisoned for having an affair with the wife of the city governor and condemned to be executed, he is saved by and reunited with  his friend Narcissus, now an abbot. The two reflect upon the different paths their lives have taken, contrasting the artist with the thinker.

Themes

Like most of Hesse's works, the main theme of this book is the wanderer's struggle to find himself, as well as the Jungian union of polar opposites (Mysterium Coniunctionis). Goldmund represents nature and the "feminine conscious mind" (but also anima, a man's unconscious), while Narcissus represents science and logic and God and the "masculine conscious mind" (but also animus, a woman's unconscious). These "feminine" and "masculine" qualities are drawn from the Jungian archetypal structure, and is reminiscent of some of his earlier works, especially Demian. Throughout the novel, Goldmund increasingly becomes aware of memories of his own mother, which ultimately results in his desire to return to the Urmutter (primordial mother).  However, he also tries to reconcile the Apollonian and Dionysian ideals through art (giving form to the formless).

English translations
The first translation into English (by Geoffrey Dunlop) appeared in 1932 titled Death and the Lover. Penguin Modern Classics published this translation in 1971, entitled "Narziss and Goldmund", reprinting in 1971, 1972x2, 1973x2, 1974x2, 1976, 1978. In 1968, a translation by Ursule Molinaro was published as Narcissus and Goldmund. In 1994 a new translation by Leila Vennewitz was shortlisted for the Schlegel-Tieck Prize.

Influences

The 1974 Kansas song "Journey from Mariabronn" closely follows the plot of the book.

Film adaption 
A cinema adaption called Narziss und Goldmund, directed by the Austrian Oscar-winning director Stefan Ruzowitzky, was released in 2020. It starred Jannis Niewöhner as Goldmund and Sabin Tambrea as Narziss.

References

1930 German novels
Novels by Hermann Hesse
Swiss bildungsromans
Novels set in Germany
Catholicism in fiction
Novels set in the Middle Ages